The Stemme S6 is a two-seat touring motorglider manufactured by Stemme AG. Unlike the S10, the S6 has a non-retractable three-bladed propeller (that can feather like other touring motor gliders), a wider fuselage design, and tricycle landing gear, available both with fixed and retractable configurations. Its engine is a Bombardier-Rotax 914, the same engine used in the Stemme S10-VT.
The designers placed great importance on noise and vibration reduction.

The prototype S6 made its first flight on 29 November 2006 at Strausberg Airport, flown by Lothar Dalldorff.  It received EASA approval on 22 October 2008.

Variants
S6 100 hp, fixed landing gear.
S6-R retractable landing gear.
S6-T115 hp turbocharged engine
S6-RT 115 hp turbocharged engine, retractable landing gear. First flown 10 December 2002.
S6ew Sky Sportster 20m wingspan with a 38 to 1 glide ratio
S8-T as S6-T 
S8-RT as S6-RT but with roomier cockpit and greater fuel capacity.

Specifications (S6-T)

References

External links

S06
Motor gliders
T-tail aircraft
Single-engined tractor aircraft
High-wing aircraft
Mid-engined aircraft
Aircraft first flown in 2008